Pirambu is a municipality located in the Brazilian state of Sergipe. Its population was 9,359 (2020) and its area is 218 km².

The municipality contains part of the  Santa Isabel Biological Reserve, a strictly protected conservation unit created in 1988.

References

Municipalities in Sergipe
Populated coastal places in Sergipe